SK Trhači Kadaň is an ice hockey team in Kadaň, Czech Republic. The club was founded in 1945 and defunct in 2021.

Achievements
Czech 2.liga champion: 1998.

References

External links
http://www.skkadan.cz/ Official site

Ice hockey teams in the Czech Republic
Ice hockey clubs established in 1945
1945 establishments in Czechoslovakia
Kadaň
Sport in Ústí nad Labem Region